A gubernatorial election was held on 21 february 2010 to elect the next governor of , a prefecture of Japan in northwestern area of the island of Kyushu.

Candidates

Genjiro Kaneko was the 65-year-old incumbent.  He was first elected in 1998, but decided to retire and supported his vice-governor Hōdō Nakamura.

The candidates were:
Hōdō Nakamura, vice-governor, endorsed by LDP and Komeito.
Tsuyoshi Hashimoto, endorsed by DPJ, PNP and SDP.
Atsushi Ōnita, 52, professional wrestler, former member of the House of Councillors for the LDP.
Reiko Oshibuchi. 
Takao Fukamachi, supported by the JCP.
Masahiko Yamada, dissident of DPJ.
Mitsuyuki Matsushita.

Results

References 

2010 elections in Japan
Nagasaki gubernational elections